is a Japanese former professional baseball pitcher.

His submarine pitching form was noted during the 2006 World Baseball Classic.

Amateur career
Watanabe began baseball at age 6, and began throwing underhanded during middle school at the suggestion of his father. Watanabe attracted little attention through high school and college, and joined the Kazusa Magic amateur baseball team in 1999 after graduating from college. He was finally noticed by professional scouts when he was chosen as a member of the 2000 Sydney Olympics Japanese national team, where he marked a win in a game against Italy.

He pitched in the Japanese national amateur baseball tournament in late 2000 and was drafted in the 4th round by the Chiba Lotte Marines that year.

Professional career
Watanabe made his debut in April 2001, starting a game against the Orix BlueWave. He won his first professional game with a complete game shutout, and ended the season with 2 wins. In 2002, he pitched in 6 games and had a record of 0–3. In 2003, he gave up 8 runs in his first start, and became a part of the starting rotation at the middle of the year, going 9–4 with a 3.66 ERA. He won 12 games the following year, won 15 games in 2005 with a 2.17 ERA. The Marines won their first championship in 31 years in 2005, and Watanabe pitched in the second game of the Japanese championship series against the Hanshin Tigers, giving up 4 hits in a shutout victory.

He was chosen as a member of the World Baseball Classic team in 2006, but pitched poorly during the season, ending up with a 5–11 record, and a 4.35 ERA. He also led the league in hit batsmen (14).

He holds the Japanese record for skipping stones, recorded on a show on Nippon Television. Chiba Lotte Marines manager Bobby Valentine made an appearance on the show as well.

On November 6, 2004 David Ortiz of the Boston Red Sox hit a 525-foot home run off Watanabe when the United States Major League Baseball team faced the Nippon Professional Baseball team in the second game of the traditional Japan All-Star Series. This blast by "Big Papi" has been recorded as the longest home run ever hit at the Tokyo Dome.

He was released by Lotte on November 4, 2013. On December 13, Watanabe signed a minor league contract with Major League Baseball's Boston Red Sox.  He was released by the Red Sox on March 30 and on April 14 signed with the Lancaster Barnstormers of the Atlantic League of Professional Baseball.

Pitching style

Watanabe is known for having the world's lowest release point, letting go of the ball only about 2 inches above the ground, and his hand sometimes brushes against the ground as he throws. His body is much closer to the ground than other submarine pitchers, and his right knee has bled during games because it skids against the mound. He puts a pad on the inside of his uniform around the knee to prevent himself from bleeding. Watanabe's form is truly one of a kind, as there is no other pitcher in the world who throws from the same arm angle. Batters have trouble timing their swings against Watanabe, because his pitches seem to come in at completely different speeds compared to those of conventional pitchers.

Watanabe relies on his distinct pitching form and timing to get batters out. In addition to changing speeds with his pitches, he sometimes changes the time he takes to windup and release the ball. He does not have precise control, but is consistent in the lower part of the strike zone. Watanabe is not known to strike out batters, (only 101 strikeouts in 187 innings in 2005) and relies on forcing batters to hit themselves into outs. His underhanded form requires less energy than a conventional pitching form, and he is able to pitch into later innings.

Watanabe throws four main pitches; a fastball, sinker, gyroball, and a slider. Being a submarine pitcher, Watanabe's fastball is slow, sitting in mid to high-70s mph and topping out at low-80s mph, with movements. The sinker is probably his best pitch, as he fools batters by throwing it at the same speed as his fastball, or sometimes even faster. His slider is about 8-9 mph slower than his fastball, and breaks downward. Watanabe's gyroball is very slow, clocking around 60 mph, somewhat similar to the curveball of Washington Nationals pitcher Liván Hernández (which actually is more like an eephus pitch). He often experiments with the gyroball, changing grips to make it resemble a change-up more than a gyroball. Watanabe's gyroball (thought to be a slow non-breaking curveball) is held with a two-seam grip. Watanabe's control over the gyroball is below average, but he does get looking strikes and groundballs with it.

See also
 World Baseball Classic
 List of Japanese baseball players

References

External links

 Shunsuke Watanabe Official Site(Japanese)
 
 
 

1976 births
2006 World Baseball Classic players
2009 World Baseball Classic players
Baseball players at the 2000 Summer Olympics
Chiba Lotte Marines players
Japanese expatriate baseball players in the United States
Lancaster Barnstormers players
Leones del Caracas players
Japanese expatriate baseball players in Venezuela
Living people
Olympic baseball players of Japan
Baseball people from Tochigi Prefecture